The Canberra District wine region is located around Canberra in the Capital city of Australia. It covers the northern part of the Australian Capital Territory and an area of New South Wales to the east and north of that, including towns of Bungendore, Murrumbateman and Yass, New South Wales.

Wine is grown and produced in a triangular area of about 60 km sides bordered by Canberra, Yass, and Bungendore, taking in the important localities of Murrumbateman and Lake George. The district is noted as a cool-climate wine area, but encompasses a substantial climatic range, with the lower altitude and more inland regions near Yass substantially warmer than the higher altitude areas near Bungendore.

History
The industry dates from the 1970s, although wines were produced in the settlement near Yass in the 1860s.

Climate and geography
The region receives moderate, but variable rainfall, and vineyards require supplemental irrigation in most years. Promising recent results from Tempranillo may be explained by the strong homoclime to Ribera del Duero.
Annual rainfall: 
Mean January (late growth period) temp: 
Sunshine hours per day: 7.4

Production
The main grape varieties grown are Riesling, Chardonnay, Sauvignon blanc, Sémillon, Cabernet Sauvignon, Shiraz, Viognier, Tempranillo, Pinot noir and Pinot gris. Picking and vintage extend from late February (Pinot noir, Chardonnay) to late May (botrytis Pinot gris or Riesling).

About two thirds of the vines are red wine varieties, and one third are white.

See also
Australian wine

References

External links
Canberra Wines

Geography of Canberra
Wine regions of New South Wales